Daniel Marian Mocanu, known as Dani Mocanu, is a Romanian Romani manele singer.

Biography 
Daniel Mocanu was born on September 3, 1992 in Bradu Commune, Argeș County, and attended the "Ion C. Brătianu" National College in Piteşti, where he was a mediocre student. He played in the junior team of FC Argeș Pitești and in the junior team of FCSB. Mocanu did not continue his career in football afterwards, choosing to be active in the music field. His career in music was initially encouraged by the music teacher Maria Cosmescu from the "Ion C. Brătianu" National College in Pitesti.

Career 
Mocanu performs music in the manele style, but with influences from the rap and trap genres. He also plays fiddle music in private. Many of the lyrics in Monday's songs are about breaking the law, going to jail, revenge or faith in God.

Mocanu announced his retirement from activity as of January 7, 2021, his last piece being published on January 1 of the same year. After seven months, he returned to music with a new song, still up to now.

Controversies 
Daniel Mocanu has been involved in a series of controversies due to his open association with personalities from the Romanian underworld.

Prostitution and incitement to violence against women 
On September 26, 2017 Mocanu was arrested and charged in an action organized by the DIICOT Dâmbovița. He was accused by DIICOT prosecutors of leading an organized criminal group, specialized in pimping, money laundering and human trafficking. Mocanu, along with 11 other individuals, is accused of sending a number of young girls into prostitution in the UK and Ireland. In November 2017, his assets were seized by DIICOT prosecutors. As a reaction to the arrest and indictment, Mocanu stated that "he is not a thug or a criminal, he just sings about facts inspired by the people", this "because he loves freedom and it didn't even occur to him to be a fish". The trial in which Mocanu is being tried was not resolved until the end of 2020.

On January 15, 2020 Mocanu was sent to court for committing the crime of incitement to hatred or discrimination. He was reported to the National Council for Combating Discrimination after uploading the video of the song Curwa to the YouTube platform, encouraging violence against women. The complaint was based on the reference to the woman as an object in the lyrics of the song, the comparison of women to dogs and the holding of a woman in chains in the video. In the complaint to the National Council for Combating Discrimination, the play is described as representing "sex discrimination and incitement to violence and has the effect of creating an atmosphere of intimidation, hostile, degrading, humiliating and offensive towards women, especially since the messages conveyed through the lyrics and video of the song "Curwa" are from an artist known to the general public, thus legitimizing and encouraging misogynistic attitudes".

Cruelty to animals 
On November 22, 2020 a criminal case was opened against Daniel Mocanu after he published a video in which he appeared with a visibly injured and malnourished lion.

Discography and award

Albums 
 Nu dau înapoi (Big Man, 2016)
 Acuzat (Big Man, 2018)
 Acuzați-mă De Hituri (Big Man, 2019)

Award 
 YouTube Gold Creator Award – 3,36 mil. subscribing on YouTube

References

External links 
 
 Dani Mocanu on YouTube
 
 
 

1992 births
Living people
21st-century Romanian singers
21st-century Romanian male singers
Romanian manele singers
Romanian male singers
Romanian rappers
People from Argeș County
Romanian Romani people
Romani singers